The 2014 Aragon motorcycle Grand Prix was the fourteenth round of the 2014 Grand Prix motorcycle racing season. It was held at the Motorland Aragón in Alcañiz on 28 September 2014.

The MotoGP race started in dry conditions, but as the race progressed, the conditions closed in and rain started to fall. Yamaha rider Jorge Lorenzo pitted earlier than his rivals, and as conditions continued to deteriorate, Lorenzo proved to be the quickest rider on track. Accordingly, Lorenzo went on to win the race – his first victory of the season – by over 10 seconds from Forward Racing rider Aleix Espargaró. Espargaró's result was the first instance of an Open class competitor finishing on the podium. He only just held off Cal Crutchlow at the finish, by a margin of 0.017 seconds; Crutchlow recorded his first podium finish for Ducati. Repsol Honda riders Marc Márquez and Dani Pedrosa initially tried to stay out on dry tyres, but both riders crashed. They eventually remounted, swapped bikes, and ultimately finished the race 13th and 14th. Valentino Rossi had been making progress up the order, from sixth on the grid, when he ran wide onto the grass – damp due to the wet conditions – and crashed heavily. He lost consciousness briefly after the crash, and was transferred to a hospital in Alcañiz for a precautionary CT scan.

In the supporting categories, Maverick Viñales took his second victory of the 2014 Moto2 season, leading home championship leader Esteve Rabat, while Johann Zarco completed the podium for the second race in succession. In Moto3, Romano Fenati won his fourth race of the season, beating Álex Márquez – who took the championship lead in the process – and Danny Kent to the line in a close finish. The championship leader going into the round, Jack Miller, could only finish 27th, after colliding with Márquez. Both riders met with race directors after the race in regard to the incident, but no further action was warranted.

Classification

MotoGP

Moto2

Moto3

Championship standings after the race (MotoGP)
Below are the standings for the top five riders and constructors after round fourteen has concluded.

Riders' Championship standings

Constructors' Championship standings

 Note: Only the top five positions are included for both sets of standings.

References

2014 MotoGP race reports
Aragon Motorcycle Grand Prix
Aragon motorcycle Grand Prix
Aragon motorcycle Grand Prix